Guildford is a rural locality in the local government area (LGA) of Waratah–Wynyard in the North-west and west LGA region of Tasmania. The 2016 census has a population of nil for the state suburb of Guildford.

History 
Guildford was gazetted as a locality in 1974.
It was a  railway station and junction on the Emu Bay Railway in West Coast Tasmania.
It was an important junction to the Waratah Branch (Mount Bischoff) railway, and in turn a connection to the  gauge  Magnet Tramway (Operating 1901 to 1910s).  The station and associated buildings no longer exist.

Geography
The Arthur River forms part of the western boundary. The Hellyer River rises in the south of the locality and flows through to the north.

Road infrastructure 
The Murchison Highway (Route A10) passes through from north-west to south. Route B18 (Ridgley Highway) starts at an intersection with A10 and runs north-east until it exits. Route B23 (Waratah Road) starts at an intersection with A10 and runs south-west until it exits. Route C132 (Belvoir Road) passes through the south-east corner of the locality.

Bibliography

See also

 Railways on the West Coast of Tasmania

References

Towns in Tasmania
Localities of Waratah–Wynyard Council
Western Tasmania
Disused railway stations in Tasmania